Ole Anthon Olsen (14 September 1889 – 17 March 1972) was a Danish amateur football player, who played in the forward position. He scored 14 goals in 16 games for the Denmark national team, and won a silver medal at the 1912 Summer Olympics.

Born in Copenhagen, Olsen played for a handful of Copenhagen clubs. While playing for B.93, he made his Danish national team debut. He was selected for the Danish squad at the 1912 Summer Olympics, playing all Denmark's three games at the tournament. He scored seven goals in the tournament, and was Danish to scorer as the team won olympic silver medals. After the 1912 Olympics, he scored six goals in five games until September 1915, making his Danish national team total 13 goals in eight games.

With B.93, he won the 1916 Danish football championship, scoring two goals in the championship final 3–2 win against KB. For the national team, he did not recover his impressive goal scoring form from his early years, and in his last eight national team games until October 1927, he scored one goal in eight games. He ended his national team career in 1927, having won his second Danish championship with B.93.

See also
Dansk Boldspil-Union
DBU Copenhagen

References

1889 births
1972 deaths
Danish men's footballers
Denmark international footballers
Boldklubben af 1893 players
Footballers at the 1912 Summer Olympics
Olympic footballers of Denmark
Olympic silver medalists for Denmark
Olympic medalists in football
Medalists at the 1912 Summer Olympics
Association football forwards
Footballers from Copenhagen